Part Seventeen (Part XVII) of the Constitution of Albania is the seventeenth of eighteen parts. Titled Revision of the Constitution, it consists of 1 article and sanctions: how; by whom; in what way; and when constitutional changes are made.

Revision of the Constitution

References

17